Tønsberg Canal Bridge ( or just Kanalbrua) is a double-leaf bascule bridge connecting the mainland city of Tønsberg and the isle of Nøtterøy in Tønsberg municipality, Vestfold og Telemark county, Norway. The bridge crosses the Sten Canal and was built and opened in 1957. The Tønsberg Canal Bridge usually opens five times daily during the summer seasons, in 9:05 AM, 12:05 AM, 2:05 PM, 6:05 PM and 8:05 PM.

Gallery

References

Bridges in Vestfold og Telemark
Bridges completed in 1957
1957 establishments in Norway
Bascule bridges